Gustav Frederik Holck-Winterfeldt (1733–1776) was a Danish noble and government official. He served as the County Governor of several counties in Norway and Denmark. In 1772, he inherited the Barony of Wintersborg from his older brother and thus got the name Winterfeldt. For a time, he was the owner of the Gjedsergaard manor.

References

1733 births
1776 deaths
County governors of Norway